Amaro Macedo (10 May 1914 – 27 June 2014) was a Brazilian botanist who was the best-known collector of the Brazilian Cerrado plant species of the 20th century. He lived in Ituiutaba, in the state of Minas Gerais, Brazil. He started his collection in 1943 when he was a teacher of natural sciences in the Instituto Marden, Ituiutaba. He collected most of his plant material in the Cerrado vegetation of the states of Minas Gerais, Goiás, Maranhão and Pará. He collected also in the regions of the villages of Natividade, Porto Nacional and Filadelfia, at the time part of the state of Goiás, although now part of the state of Tocantins. Plant specimens from his collection are in several herbaria in Brazil and outside. Between 1943 and 2007 he collected 6,008 plant specimens, several of them are considered new species and some were named for him by fellow botanists.

Biography
Macedo, the son of Otavio Macedo, a farmer from the Triângulo Mineiro in the State of Minas Gerais (MG), and Maria da Gloria Chaves Macedo, was married to Celia Duarte Macedo. The couple had four daughters: Regina, Marilia, Beatriz and Maria do Carmo. He was born Campina Verde, Brazil and attended primary school in Ituiutaba and secondary school in Campanha, Minas Gerais. Afterwards he was a student at the Escola Superior de Viçosa, now known as the Universidade Federal de Viçosa (Federal University of Viçosa) - UFV, Minas Gerais, as a technician in agriculture. In 1935 he moved to Ituiutaba, MG, to teach primary school classes at the new Instituto Marden. Soon he was teaching mathematics, sciences and technical design in the secondary classes of the same Institute. He was a teacher of statistics at the Commerce School and was responsible for the administration of the Instituto Marden when his brother-in-law was on leave. At the time he was also responsible for the classes of mathematics and sciences at the Colegio Santa Tereza, a Roman Catholic school run by nuns in Ituiutaba. As a teacher of Natural Sciences he had to teach the scientific names of common plant species; since his pupils were for the most part sons of farmers from the region and they were particularly interested to know the Latin names of the plants that were growing on their farms. He had to study to learn this subject and decided also to have field classes with his students.

He wrote to well-known botanists in Brazil asking for help in how to collect and prepare plant specimens. He collected most of his plant material in the cerrado vegetation of the States of Minas Gerais, Goiás, Maranhão and Pará. He collected also in the regions of the villages of Natividade, Porto Nacional and Filadelfia, at the time part of the State of Goiás, although now part of the state of Tocantins. His first plant specimen was collected on May 3, 1943, in Ituiutaba – Roupala tomentosa Pohl. He travelled all over the cerrado region and wrote diaries of his trips in which he describes the plants, the environment, the villages, the customs of the people, the food, the transport, the rivers and so on. When he retired from teaching, he started a new life as a farmer, but continued collecting plant material. One day collecting material in the farm he was struck by a branch of Bauhinia bongardi Steud. which left him totally blind of his left eye.

Tributes
He has a mention from the British Museum of Natural History for his work with the Brazilian flora. In 1958 he received a medal, Medalha de Mérito Dom João VI, from the Brazilian government for his services to the Rio de Janeiro Botanical Garden.

Exchanges with well-known botanists
He learned from and kept an exchange of correspondence with Brazilian botanists, such as Joaquim Franco de Toledo, Oswaldo Handro, Frederico Carlos Hoehne, Graziela Maciel Barroso, Carlos de Toledo Rizzini, Alexandre Curt Brade, Guido Frederico João Pabst, Gil Martins Felippe, and Lúcia Rossi e João Aguiar Nogueira Batista. He also was in frequent touch with botanists outside Brazil, such as Carlos M.D.E. Legrand, from Uruguay, Lorenzo R. Parodi and Arturo E. Burkart, from Argentina, Harold N. Moldenke, Richard Sumner Cowan, Robert E. Woodson Jr., Conrad V. Morton, Jason R. Swallen, and Lyman B. Smith, from the United States, Noel Y. Sandwith, from England, Joseph V. Monachino, an Italian working in the United States, and Erik Asplund, from Sweden.

Plant specimens
Plant specimens from his collection are all over herbaria of Brazil and outside. In 1963 he donated a herbarium of 1,723 plant specimens to the Instituto de Botânica de São Paulo. Between 1943 and 2007 he collected 6,008 plant specimens, several of them are considered new species and some were named after him by fellow botanists.

New species collected by Macedo
Acanthaceae
Amphiscopia grandis Rizzini
Chaetothylax erenthemanthus Rizzini
Chaetothylax tocantinus var longispicus Rizzini
Hygrophila humistrata Rizzini
Lophothecium paniculatum Rizzini
Ruellia capitata Rizzini
Ruellia rufipila Rizzini
Amaryllidaceae
Amaryllis minasgerais H.P. Traub
Asclepiadaceae
Ditassa maranhensis Fontella & C. Valente
Bignoniaceae
Distictella dasytricha Sandwith
Bromeliaceae
Bromelia interior L.B. Smith
Compositae
Gochnatia barrosii Cabrera
Tricogonia atenuata G.M.Barroso
Connaraceae
Rourea psammophila E. Forero
Gramineae
Luziola divergens J.R. Swallen
Olyra taquara Swallen
Panicum pirineosense Swallen
Paspalum crispulum Swallen
Paspalum fessum Swallen
Paspalum formosum Swallen
Paspalum latipes Swallen
Paspalum pallens Swallen
Sporobolus hians van Schaack
Labiatae
Hyptis argentea Epling & Mathias
Salvia expansa Epling
Liliaceae
Herreria latifolia Woodson
Melastomataceae
Rhynchanthera philadelphensis Brade
Velloziaceae
Vellozia hypoxoides L.B. Smith

New species dedicated to Amaro Macedo
Acanthaceae
Sericographis macedoana Rizzini — Arch. Jard. Bot. Rio de Janeiro 8; 357, 1948
Aspidiaceae
Polybotrya macedoi Brade — Bradea l: 24, 1969
Bromeliaceae
Bromelia macedoi L.B.Sm. — Buli. Bromeliad Soe. 8: 12, 1958
Dyckia macedoi L.B.Sm. — Arch. Bot. São Paulo n. ser. 2: 195, 1952
Compositae
Mikania macedoi G.M.Barroso — Arch. Jard. Bot. Rio de Janeiro 16: 247, 1959
Vernonia macedoi G.M.Barroso — Arch. Jard. Bot. Rio de Janeiro 13: 9, 1954
Wedelia macedoi H.Rob. — Phytologia 55:396, 1984
Convolvulaceae
Ipomoea macedoi Hoehne — Arq. Bot. Estado São Paulo n s. 2: 110, 1950
Dryopteridaceae
Polybotrya macedoi Brade — Bradea 1: 24, 1969
Gramineae
Paspatum macedoi Swallen — Phytologia 14: 377, 1967
Lauraceae
Aiouea macedoana Vattimo-Gil — Anais 15 Congr. Soc. Bot. Brasil 168, 1967
Leguminosae–Caesalpinioideae
Cassia macedoi H.S.Irwin &. Barneby — Mem. New York Bot. Gard, 30; 136,1978
Chamaecrista macedoi (H.S.Irwin & Barneby) H.S.Irwin & Barneby — Mem. New York Bot. Gard. 35: 654,1982
Leguminosae–Mimosoideae
Mimosa macedoana Burkart — Darwiniana 13: 389,1964
Leguminosae–Papilionoideae
Arachis macedoi Krapov. & W.C.Greg. — Bonplandia (Corrientes) 8: 55, 1994
Harpalyce macedoi R.S.Cowan — Brittonia 10: 31,1958
Malpighiaceae
Banisteriopsis macedoana L.B.Sm. — J. Wash. Acad. Sci. 45: 198, 1955
Stigmaphyllon macedoanum C. E. Anderson — Contr. Univ. Michigan Herb. 17: 10, 1990
Malvaceae
Peltaea macedoi Krapov. & Cristobal —Kurtziana 2:196, 1965
Melastomataceae
Macairea macedoi Brade — Arch. Jard. Bot. Rio de Janeiro 16: 31, 1959
Microlicía amaroi Brade — Arch. Jard. Bot. Rio de Janeiro 16:29, 1959
Microlicia macedoi L.B.Sm. & Wurdack — J. Wash. Acad. Sci. 45: 200, 1955
Tococa macedoi Brade — Arch. Jard. Bot. Rio de Janeiro 16: 32, 1959
Myrtaceae
Eugenia macedoi Mattos & D.Legrand — Loefgrenia 67: 24,1975
Hexachlamys macedoi D.Legrand — Loefgrenia 55: 1, 1972
Marlierea macedoi D.Legrand —Bot. Mus. Hist. Nat. Montevideo, 3: 27, 1962
Psidium macedoi Kausel — Lilloa 33: 108, 1971 (publ.1972)
Ochnaceae
Luxemburgia macedoi Dwyer — J. Wash. Acad. Sci. 45: 198, 1955
Onagraceae
Pelozia macedoi Krapov. & Cristóbal — Kurtziana 2: 196, 1965
Opiliaceae
Agonandra macedoi Toledo — Arch. Bot. São Paulo n.s. 3:13, 1952
Orchidaceae
Cyrtopodium macedoi J.A.N.Bat. & Bianch. — Novon 16: 17, 2006
Piperaceae
Peperomia macedoana Yunck. — Bol. Inst. Bot. (São Paulo) 3:189, 1966
Piper macedoi Yunck. — Boi. Inst. Bot. (São Paulo) 3: 51, 1966
Polypodiaceae
Pecluma macedoi (Brade) M.KessIer &. A.R.Sm. — Candollea 60: 281, 2005
Polypodium macedoi Brade — Arch. Jard. Bot. Rio de Janeiro 11: 30, 1951
Rubiaceae
Galianthe macedoi E.L.Cabral — Bonplandia (Corrientes) 10:121, 2000
Rutaceae
Teclea macedoi Exell & Mendonça — Garcia de Orta. Ser. Bot. 1: 93, 1973
Vepris macedoi (Exell &. Mendonça) W.Mziray —Symb. Bot. Upsal. 30: 73, 1992
Velloziaceae
Vellozia macedonis Woodson— Ann. Missouri Bot. Gard. 37: 398, 1950
Verbenaceae
Lippia macedoi Moldenke — Phytologia 6: 327, 1958
Stachytarpheta macedoi Moldenke — Phytologia 3: 276, 1950
Viscaceae
Phoradendron macedonis Rizzini — Rodriguesia 18-19: 163, 1956

References

Brazilian Orchids Orchids News #31. Last visited 2009-07-19.
Clifford, H. T. & Bostock, P. D. Etymological Dictionary of Grasses. Springer Berlin Heidelberg, 2007. 
Felippe, Gil e Macedo, Maria do Carmo. Amaro Macedo – o solitário do cerrado, 1.ª edição, Cotia - SP, Brazil. Ateliê Editorial, 2009, 
Jornal do Pontal 2009-05-22 <https://web.archive.org/web/20110706153327/http://www.jornaldopontal.com.br/index.php?ac=colunas&id=82>. Last visited 2009-07-19.
Jusbrasil - Entrega de Títulos Emociona Convidados. Last visited 2009-07-17.

20th-century Brazilian botanists
Brazilian centenarians
Men centenarians
1914 births
2014 deaths